Wouter Van Besien (born 1972) is a Belgian politician. From 25 October 2009 until 15 November 2014, he was the chairman of the ecologist party Groen.

Van Besien got a master's degree in Sociology at the Katholieke Universiteit Leuven, and obtained a second master's degree in Developing Area Studies at the University of Hull (United Kingdom). He participated as a youngster in Flemish scouting and became 1998 the national secretary of the Chiro-youth in Flanders.

In 2001 he started working as a member of Agalev in Antwerp. He has been municipal civic office worker in Borgerhout since 2006 and followed Mieke Vogels as president of the Flemish green party Groen.
In 2006, he became a member of the district council of (district of Antwerp).

In 2009 Van Besien became chairman of Groen. In 2010, he was re-elected as only candidate in a statute congress of Groen for four years, with a score of 94%. He did not run again when his mandate ended on 15 November 2014 and was succeeded by Meyrem Almaci.

Career
2006 – 2012:  Member of the district council of Borgerhout
2013 - :  Member of the city council of Antwerp 
2009 – 2014:  Chairman of Groen
2014 – 2019:  Member of the Flemish Parliament for Antwerp

References

External links

Groen (political party) politicians
Living people
1972 births
KU Leuven alumni
Alumni of the University of Hull
21st-century Belgian politicians